Elizabeth Township is the name of at least two townships in the U.S. state of Pennsylvania:
 Elizabeth Township, Allegheny County, Pennsylvania
 Elizabeth Township, Lancaster County, Pennsylvania

Pennsylvania township disambiguation pages